Nebo-Sarsekim Tablet is a clay cuneiform inscription referring to an official at the court of Nebuchadnezzar II, king of Babylon.  It may also refer to an official named in the Biblical Book of Jeremiah.

It is currently in the collection of the British Museum. Dated to circa 595 BC, the tablet was part of an archive from a large sun-worship temple at Sippar.

Description

The tablet is a clay cuneiform inscription (2.13 inches; 5.5 cm) with the following translation:

[Regarding] 1.5 minas (~850 grams / 27 troy oz) of gold, the property of Nabu-sharrussu-ukin, the chief eunuch, which he sent via Arad-Banitu the eunuch to [the temple] Esangila: Arad-Banitu has delivered [it] to Esangila. In the presence of Bel-usat, son of Alpaya, the royal bodyguard, [and of] Nadin, son of Marduk-zer-ibni. Month XI, day 18, year 10 [of] Nebuchadnezzar, king of Babylon.

Discovery

Archaeologists unearthed the tablet in the ancient city of Sippar (about a mile from modern Baghdad) in the 1870s.  The British Museum acquired it in 1920, but it had remained in storage unpublished until Michael Jursa (associate professor at the University of Vienna) discovered its relevance to biblical history. He noted that both the name and the title (rab ša-rēši) of the official closely matched the Hebrew text of Jeremiah 39:3. Additionally, the tablet is dated just eight years before the events in Jeremiah. According to Jursa, the rarity of the Babylonian name, the high rank of the rab ša-rēši and the close proximity in time make it almost certain that the person mentioned on the tablet is identical with the biblical figure.

Bible comparisons 

According to Jeremiah (39:3 in the Masoretic Text or 46:3 in the Septuagint), an individual by this same name visited Jerusalem during the Babylonian conquest of it.  The verse begins by stating that all the Babylonian officials sat authoritatively in the Middle Gate, then names several of them, and concludes by adding that all the other officials were there as well.

Over the years, Bible translators have divided the named individuals in different ways (as seen in the table below), rendering anywhere from two to eight names.

Josephus 

In Book 10 (chapter VIII, paragraph 2; or line 135) of his Antiquities of the Jews, Josephus records the Babylonian officials as:

William Whiston's translation follows the KJV/ASV rendition, albeit reversing two of them:

 Nergal Sharezer, Samgar Nebo, Rabsaris, Sarsechim, and Rabmag

The literal translation by Christopher T. Begg and Paul Spilsbury is:

 Regalsar, Aremant, Semegar, Nabosaris, and Acarampsaris

See also 

Biblical archaeology
Cylinder of Nabonidus
List of artifacts significant to the Bible

References

External links 

 Initial news coverage:

Times Online article by Dalya Alberge

Telegraph article by Nigel Reynolds with alternate photo

 Josephus translations:
Antiquities book 10, section 135 via Perseus at Tufts University (English)
Antiquities book 10, section 135 via Perseus at Tufts University (Greek)
Antiquities via PACE at York University (enter Book 10, Section 135 manually)
 Professional commentaries:
An edition of the Nebu(!)sarsekim Tablet by an Assyriologist (providing transcription, transliteration and translation of its text along with some rudimentary observations on its content and context)
Christopher Heard (initial observations)
Christopher Heard (continued discussion)
John F. Hobbins (with details on Assyrian names by Charles Halton)

6th-century BC inscriptions
1870s archaeological discoveries
Archaeological artifacts
Babylonia
Middle Eastern objects in the British Museum
Akkadian inscriptions
Clay tablets
Jewish Babylonian history
Sippar